The Queen's Birthday Honours 2012 for Australia were announced on 11 June 2012.

† indicates an award given posthumously.

Order of Australia

Companion (AC)

General Division

Officer (AO)

General Division

Military Division

Member (AM)

General Division

Military Division

Medal (OAM)

General Division

Military Division

Public Service Medal (PSM)

Australian Police Medal (APM)

Australian Fire Service Medal (AFSM)

Ambulance Service Medal (ASM)

Emergency Services Medal (ESM)

Medal for Gallantry (MG)

Commendation for Gallantry

Distinguished Service Cross (DSC)

Distinguished Service Medal (DSM)

Commendation for Distinguished Service

Conspicuous Service Cross (CSC)

Bar to the Conspicuous Service Medal

Conspicuous Service Medal (CSM)

References

2012 awards
Orders, decorations, and medals of Australia
2012 awards in Australia